Nizhneyansk is an urban locality (an urban-type settlement) in Ust-Yansky District of the Sakha Republic, Russia, located  from Deputatsky, the administrative center of the district, in the Yana River delta. As of the 2010 Census, its population was 391.

History
It was founded in the 1940s and was granted urban-type settlement status in 1958.

Administrative and municipal status
Within the framework of administrative divisions, the urban-type settlement of Nizhneyansk is incorporated within Ust-Yansky District as the Settlement of Nizhneyansk. As a municipal division, the Settlement of Nizhneyansk is incorporated within Ust-Yansky Municipal District as Nizhneyansk Urban Settlement.

References

Notes

Sources
Official website of the Sakha Republic. Registry of the Administrative-Territorial Divisions of the Sakha Republic. Ust-Yansky District.

External links
Video: Nizhneyansk today

Urban-type settlements in the Sakha Republic
Populated places of Arctic Russia
Yana basin